Ronald Reece Slocum (July 2, 1945 — August 25, 1988) was an American professional baseball player. Slocum appeared in 80 games for the San Diego Padres of Major League Baseball during that team's first three seasons of existence, including the entire  season. A catcher and third baseman when he entered professional baseball, he was a utility infielder and backup catcher for San Diego, playing a near-equal number of games at third base, catcher, shortstop and second base.

Slocum attended Helix High School. He was initially signed by the Pittsburgh Pirates and spent five seasons (1964–1968) in their minor league system before his newly created hometown team, the MLB Padres, chose him as the 55th overall selection in the National League's portion of the 1968 Major League Baseball expansion draft. Slocum spent the  minor league season with the Double-A Elmira Pioneers before his recall by the Padres in September.

Major League career
On September 16 at San Diego Stadium, against the Houston Astros, he started at third base and collected his first two Major League hits, a single off Tom Griffin and a two-run home run off Jack Billingham. Overall, he batted .292 in 13 games, and won a job as a utility player on the 1970 San Diego roster the following season.

Slocum played in 60 games for the 1970 Padres, but in 71 at bats he could muster only ten hits, including his second MLB home run, two doubles and two triples. He was the starting second baseman on July 21, 1970 — the day that Padre manager Preston Gómez controversially used a pinch hitter (Cito Gaston) for Clay Kirby in the eighth inning of a game in which Kirby was throwing a no-hitter against the New York Mets (although Kirby left the game trailing 1–0).

In , Slocum again made the Padre opening-season roster, but he went hitless in 18 April at bats and was sent to the Triple-A Hawaii Islanders, where he spent the remainder of his career. He retired in 1972.

Death
Ronald Slocum died in 1988 from AIDS, though news of his death did not reach researchers until 2014. He was survived by his two children and eight grandchildren.

References

External links

1945 births
1988 deaths
Baseball players from California
Batavia Pirates players
Elmira Pioneers players
Gastonia Pirates players
Hawaii Islanders players
Kinston Eagles players
Major League Baseball catchers
Major League Baseball infielders
People from San Diego County, California
Raleigh Pirates players
Reno Silver Sox players
Salem Rebels players
San Diego Padres players
Sportspeople from Modesto, California
Arizona Instructional League Pilots players
Florida Instructional League Pirates players